32nd National Board of Review Awards
December 22, 1960
The 32nd National Board of Review Awards were announced on December 22, 1960.

Top Ten Films 
Sons and Lovers
The Alamo
The Sundowners
Inherit the Wind
Sunrise at Campobello
Elmer Gantry
Home from the Hill
The Apartment
Wild River
The Dark at the Top of the Stairs

Top foreign Films 
The World of Apu
General della Rovere
The Angry Silence
I'm All Right Jack
Hiroshima Mon Amour

Winners 
Best Film: Sons and Lovers
Best Foreign Film: The World of Apu
Best Actor: Robert Mitchum (The Sundowners, Home from the Hill)
Best Actress: Greer Garson (Sunrise at Campobello)
Best Supporting Actor: George Peppard (Home from the Hill)
Best Supporting Actress: Shirley Jones (Elmer Gantry)
Best Director: Jack Cardiff (Sons and Lovers)

External links 
National Board of Review of Motion Pictures :: Awards for 1960

1960
National Board of Review Awards
National Board of Review Awards
National Board of Review Awards
National Board of Review Awards